Basmat may refer to:

 Basemath, name of three women in Old Testament
 Basmath, a taluka in Parbhani district in Indian state of Maharashtra